The Phantom Express is a 1925 American silent action crime film directed by John G. Adolfi and starring Ethel Shannon, David Butler, and Frankie Darro.

Plot
As described in a film magazine review, a young railroad engineer, who is in love with the daughter of another engineer, takes the throttle of his company’s fastest train after his sweetheart’s father becomes demented over a wreck. The young man drives the train without mishap for a while and then almost has a wreck. However, the near wrecking of the train reveals the man who caused the wreck and nearly ruined the young man’s happiness.

Cast

References

Bibliography
 Munden, Kenneth White. The American Film Institute Catalog of Motion Pictures Produced in the United States, Part 1. University of California Press, 1997.

External links

1925 films
1925 crime films
American crime films
Films directed by John G. Adolfi
American silent feature films
American black-and-white films
1920s English-language films
1920s American films